5th Missouri Infantry Regiment may refer to:

 5th Missouri Infantry Regiment (Confederate), a Confederate regiment during the American Civil War
 5th Missouri Infantry Regiment (Union, 3 months), a Union regiment that existed in 1861
 5th Missouri Infantry Regiment (Union, 3 years), a Union regiment that existed in 1862